Vera Klement (born 1929 Danzig) is an American artist, and Professor Emerita at the University of Chicago. She was a 1981 Guggenheim Fellow.

Biography
Klement graduated from Cooper Union in 1950. She taught at University of Chicago, from 1969 to 1995.

In 1973, Klement was a founding member of Artemisia Gallery, one of the Midwest's first feminist Cooperative Galleries located in Chicago, Illinois.

In 1987, she showed at the Renaissance Society.
She was 2003 visiting artist, at Goshen College,
and 2007 artist in residence at Indiana State University.

Her work is in the collection of the state of Illinois, The Kentucky Center for the Arts, and the Krannert Art Museum.

She lives in Chicago.

References

External links
http://veraklement.com/
http://www.printworkschicago.com/artists/klement/klement.htm
http://www.pkf-imagecollection.org/html/artistresults.asp?artist=1249&testing=true
https://web.archive.org/web/20120406122842/http://www.fassbendergallery.com/artists/VeraKlement/
https://web.archive.org/web/20120406122842/http://www.fassbendergallery.com/artists/VeraKlement/statements.html
https://web.archive.org/web/20140110100515/http://www.luc.edu/luma/flash/35_klement.html

1929 births
Living people
American artists
20th-century American women artists
Cooper Union alumni
Polish emigrants to the United States